This is a complete list of the 98 operettas of Jacques Offenbach (1819–1880).

Subgenres
The stage works of Offenbach (with the two exceptions of the opéras Die Rheinnixen and The Tales of Hoffmann) are broadly referred to as 'operettas' in English references, even though only 16 of them were designated as opérettes by the composer. Offenbach called a further 8 opérette bouffe, and there is a single 'opérette fantastique'. There are 24 opéras comiques, and 24 opéras bouffes, together with 2 'opéras bouffes féeries'.

Other minor subgenres include opéra bouffon (5), bouffonnerie musicale (3), saynète (2) pièce d'occasion (2) and revue (2). Offenbach invented names for some individual works: 'anthropophagie musicale', 'chinoiserie musicale', 'comédie à ariettes', 'conversation alsacienne', 'légende bretonne', and 'légende napolitaine'.  There are also one each of the following; 'fantasie musicale', 'opéra féerie', 'tableau villageois', and 'valse'.

List of operettas

Pastiche
Theatres in the English-speaking centres used music by Offenbach to create pasticcio during the 1860s and 70s. Many of these pieces were made to libretti completely unknown to Offenbach. Vienna also saw examples of re-use of his music, and the practice continued into the 20th century. Examples include:

 Cigarette, words by G. D'Arcy, 9 September 1876, Globe Theatre, London
 Forty Winks, an English version of Une nuit blanche
 Blush Rose, words by D'Arcy
 The Barber of Bath, words by Farnie
 Der Goldschmied von Toledo, mainly using music from Der Schwarze Corsar
 The Happiest Girl in the World, words by E. Y. Harburg, a 1961 Broadway musical
 Christopher Columbus, words by Don White, recorded in London in 1977 by Opera Rara

Le carnaval des revues and Les hannetons include pre-existing scores but were created under Offenbach and include some new music by him.

See also
For Offenbach's opéras see Die Rheinnixen and Les contes d'Hoffmann.
For Offenbach's other works, see List of compositions by Jacques Offenbach.

References
Notes

Sources
Gammond, Peter (1980). Offenbach. London: Faber & Faber. 
Lamb, Andrew (1992). "Offenbach, Jacques" in The New Grove Dictionary of Opera, ed. Stanley Sadie, vol. 3, pp. 653–658. London: Macmillan. 
 Yon, Jean-Claude (2000). Jacques Offenbach. [Paris]: Galimard. .

External links
Oper One list of works, retrieved 28 July 2011

 
Lists of operas by composer
Lists of compositions by composer